Flair can refer to:

Flair, a short-lived magazine edited by Fleur Cowles
Flair (miniseries), a 1990 Australian miniseries
Flair (pens), a brand of felt tip pens
Flair (horse), a Thoroughbred racehorse
The Flair family of American professional wrestlers (actual family name Fliehr):
 Ric Flair (born 1949), family patriarch
 David Flair (born 1979), older son
 Charlotte Flair (born 1986), ring name of daughter Ashley
 Reid Flair (1988–2013), younger son
The Flairs, an American doo-wop group in the 1950s
Flair Records, a record label
Flair bartending
Fluid-attenuated inversion recovery (FLAIR), an MRI imaging technique
Flair Software, a British video game developer and publisher
Flair Airlines, a Canadian low-fare airline
Decorative buttons adorning wait staff uniforms in the movie Office Space

See also
Flare (disambiguation)